Freedomways was the leading African-American theoretical, political and cultural journal of the 1960s–1980s. It began publishing in 1961 and ceased in 1985.

The journal's founders were  Louis Burnham, Edward Strong, W.E.B. Du Bois and its first general editor Shirley Graham Du Bois. It was later edited by Esther Cooper Jackson. For a time, Alice Walker was a contributing editor.

Freedomways reported on the progressive political movements of the time and especially the American civil rights movement, uniting the diverse perspectives of the North and the South, but was also notable for its international scope in the era of anti-colonial victories and Pan-Africanism, an aspect that contributor, editor, and writing solicitor John Henrik Clarke emphasized. In addition to noted African-American intellectuals and artists whose work appeared in Freedomways (among them writers James Baldwin, Alice Walker, Paul Robeson, Nikki Giovanni, Lorraine Hansberry, and visual artists Jacob Lawrence, Romare Bearden, and Elizabeth Catlett), the journal published the work of international literary authors (such as Pablo Neruda and Derek Walcott) and political leaders and intellectuals, (among them Kwame Nkrumah, Julius K. Nyerere, Agostinho Neto, Jomo Kenyatta, Claudia Jones and C. L. R. James).

See also
Freedom newspaper

References

Further reading

External links
 Freedomways archive at Independent Voices
 Freedomways downloadable Open Access archive at JSTOR, with image including text conversion
 BlackPast.org
 "Dr. John Henrik Clarke on Freedomways w Dr. Todd Burroughs", July 22, 2013.

African-American magazines
Defunct political magazines published in the United States
Defunct magazines published in the United States
Magazines established in 1961
Magazines disestablished in 1985
Magazines published in New York City